The 1968 All-Ireland Minor Football Championship was the 37th staging of the All-Ireland Minor Football Championship, the Gaelic Athletic Association's premier inter-county Gaelic football tournament for boys under the age of 18.

Cork entered the championship as defending champions.

On 22 September 1968, Cork won the championship following a 3-5 to 1-10 defeat of Sligo in the All-Ireland final. This was their third All-Ireland title overall and their second in succession.

Results

Connacht Minor Football Championship

Quarter-finals

Galway 1-9 Roscommon 2-6 Ballinasloe.

Galway 2-9 Roscommon 1-7 Roscommon.

Semi-finals

July 7th Sligo 3-5 Mayo 1-7 Sligo.

Galway 2-10 Leitrim 0-2 Sligo.

Final

July 21st Sligo 1-8 Galway 0-7 Castlebar.

Munster Minor Football Championship

Ulster Minor Football Championship

Leinster Minor Football Championship

All-Ireland Minor Football Championship

Semi-finals

Final

Championship statistics

Miscellaneous

 Donal Aherne of Cork becomes the second player after Tyrone's Eddie Devlin to captain a team to two All-Ireland titles.

References

1968
All-Ireland Minor Football Championship